Patrick Chukwuma "Kaduna" Nzeogwu (26 February 1937 – 29 July 1967) was a Nigerian military officer and revolutionary who played a leading role in the first military coup d'ètat of 15 January 1966, which overthrew the first Nigerian republic.

Early life

Background 
Patrick Chukwuma Nzeogwu was born in Kaduna the capital of the Northern Region to parents of the Anioma people in Okpanam Town of the Mid-Western Region (near Asaba in present-day Delta State). Nzeogwu attended Saint Joseph's Catholic Primary School in Kaduna for his elementary education and for his secondary education attended the competitive Saint John's College in Kaduna, where he became close friends with Christian Anufuro. 

In March 1957, Nzeogwu enlisted as an officer-cadet in the Nigeria Regiment of the West African Frontier Force and proceeded on a 6-month preliminary training in Ghana, then Gold Coast. He completed his training in Ghana by October 1957 and proceeded to the Royal Military Academy, Sandhurst where he was commissioned as an infantry officer in 1959. He later underwent a platoon officer's course in Hythe and a platoon commander's course in Warminster. Max Siollun, a military historian described Nzeogwu as a "devout catholic, a teetotaler, a non-smoker, and despite being a bachelor, did not spend much time chasing women".

Military career 
On his return to Nigeria in May 1960, Nzeogwu was posted to the 1st Battalion in Enugu where Major Aguiyi-Ironsi was the second-in-command under a British officer. He was later posted to the 5th Battalion in Kaduna where he became friends with Olusegun Obasanjo. His Hausa colleagues in the Nigerian Army gave him the name "Kaduna"  because of his affinity with the town. After serving in the Congo in 1961, Nzeogwu was assigned as a training officer at the Army Training Depot in Zaria for about 6 months before getting posted to Lagos to head up the military intelligence section at the Army Headquarters where he was the first Nigerian officer. 

The forerunner of the Nigerian Army Intelligence Corps (NAIC) was the Field Security Section (FSS) of the Royal Nigerian Army, which was established on 1 November 1962 with Captain PG Harrington (BR) as General Staff Officer Grade Two (GSO2 Int). The FSS was essentially a security organization whose functions included vetting of Nigerian Army (NA) personnel, document security and counter intelligence. Major Nzeogwu was the first Nigerian Officer to hold that appointment from November 1962 to 1964. As a military intelligence officer, he participated in the treasonable felony trial investigations of Obafemi Awolowo and other Action Group party members. According to Olusegun Obasanjo, "Chukwuma had some scathing remarks to make about [Nigeria's] national security, and about those who were being investigated. If he had his way, he said, his treatment of the whole case would have been different". Nzeogwu reportedly antagonised some army colleagues in his capacity as a military intelligence officer and even clashed with the Minister of State for the Army, Ibrahim Tako. Consequently, he was posted to the Nigerian Military Training College in Kaduna where he became Chief Instructor.

1966 Nigerian coup d'ètat

Planning 
The planning of the coup began with an inner circle of university-educated young officers who intended a national military revolution by seizing power in the regional capitals of Kaduna (Northern Region) and Ibadan (Western Region), and later taking control of Lagos (Federal Territory). Nzeogwu was tasked with leading the revolution in the Northern Region starting with Operation Damisa on 15 January 1966 and, at later stages, Operation Kura, Operation Zaki and Operation Giwa which would have culminated in the murder of the northern establishment.

Nzeogwu had started his preparation by organizing a two-day night exercise "Damisa" (Operation Tiger) to train soldiers in new fighting techniques. The exercise was approved by authorities of the 1st Brigade Headquarters apparently unaware of the real intentions of Nzeogwu and the Brigade Major, Alphonso Keshi had sent circulars to all units operating under the Brigade to contribute troops towards the success of the exercise. By the time Major Keshi realized "Operation Damisa" was actually a military conspiracy it was too late to counter the operation.

Execution 
In the early hours of 15 January 1966, Nzeogwu led a group of soldiers on a supposed military exercise, taking them to attack the official residence of the premier of the north, Sir Ahmadu Bello in a bloody coup that saw the murder of the Premiers of Northern and Western Nigeria. The Prime Minister (Abubakar Tafawa Balewa), a federal minister (Festus Okotie-Eboh), and top army officers from the Northern and Western regions of the nation were also murdered. From the existing government, the premier of the Eastern region (Michael Okpara), the President of the Nigerian federation (Nnamdi Azikiwe) and the Igbo Army Chief (Johnson Aguiyi-Ironsi) were notable survivors.

Nzeogwu's modus operandi in the North contributed in no small measure to the success of the coup in Northern Nigeria. 

According to a Nigerian Police Special Branch Report, Nzeogwu executed at least 4 army and police security personnel including one of the men on his team (Sergeant Daramola Oyegoke). Nzeogwu also participated in the execution of Col. Raph Shodeinde, his superior officer at the Nigerian Military Training College and is reported to have shot indiscriminately at fleeing women and children.

After waiting for an early morning radio announcement from Major Adewale Ademoyega in Lagos which did not take place because of the failure of the coup in Lagos, Major Nzeogwu made an mid-afternoon announcement, declaring martial law in Northern Nigeria.

Arrest 
Following the announcement from Kaduna, and information that Nzeogwu was gathering forces to attack Lagos which was a huge possibility at the time, Commander of the Army, Maj. Gen. Aguiyi Ironsi sent emissaries led by a man Maj. Nzeogwu heavily respected, Lt. Col. Conrad Nwawo, to Kaduna to negotiate peace talks with Maj. Nzeogwu and a possible surrender. Maj. Nzeogwu set conditions which Gen. Ironsi agreed to. Aguyi Ironsi assumed power, and Nzeogwu was later arrested in Lagos on 18 January 1966 contrary to agreements earlier reached between Nzeogwu and Ironsi. He was held in Kirikiri Maximum Security Prison in Lagos before being transferred to Aba Prison in the Eastern Region where he was released in March 1967 by Governor of the Eastern Region and future President of Biafra Chukwuemeka Ojukwu.

Civil war and death
On 30 May 1967, Biafra declared its independence from Nigeria; this was spurred by the incessant killing of Igbos in Northern Nigeria and the refusal of then military head of state General Yakubu Gowon to mobilize security personnel to stop the killings. 

On 29 July 1967, Nzeogwu - who had been promoted to the rank of a Biafran Lt. Colonel - was trapped in an ambush near Nsukka while conducting a night reconnaissance operation against federal troops of the 21st battalion under Captain Mohammed Inuwa Wushishi.

He was killed in action and his corpse was subsequently identified; however his sister insisted he killed himself to avoid being humiliated by the federal troops. After the defeat of Biafra orders were given by the Nigerian military head of state General Yakubu Gowon, for him to be buried at the military cemetery in Kaduna with full military honours.

Legacy
Some viewpoints have romanticized Nzeogwu as a revolutionary however his actions along with those of the 15 January 1966 coup conspirators constituted a putsch against a democratically elected Nigerian government. The coup resulted in the murder of top government officials and gave way to a 13-year stretch of military rule (1966 to 1979), punctuated by a democratic Nigerian government from 1979 to 1983, which was stopped by another military intervention that lasted an additional 16 years until 1999.

References

People from Kaduna
Participants in the January 1966 Nigerian military coup
Participants of coups in Nigeria
Leaders who took power by coup
Graduates of the Royal Military Academy Sandhurst
Nigerian Army officers
Igbo Army personnel
Nigerian Roman Catholics
Military personnel killed in the Nigerian Civil War
Deaths by firearm in Nigeria
20th-century Nigerian people
1937 births
1967 deaths